Creative visualization is the cognitive process of purposefully generating visual mental imagery.

Creative visualization may also refer to:

 Creative visualization (design), the creation of graphics and models to visualize products prior to production
 Creative visualization (New Age), in the context of New Age beliefs

See also
 Visualization (disambiguation)